Finlay Allan (born 6 November 2001) is a Scottish international judoka. He has represented Scotland at the Commonwealth Games and won a silver medal.

Biography
Allan based at Camberley Judo Club finished in 7th place at 2021 Junior European Cup.

In 2022, he was selected for the 2022 Commonwealth Games in Birmingham, where he competed in the men's -66 kg category, winning the silver medal.

References

2001 births
Living people
Scottish male judoka
British male judoka
Judoka at the 2022 Commonwealth Games
Commonwealth Games competitors for Scotland
Commonwealth Games silver medallists for Scotland
Commonwealth Games medallists in judo
Medallists at the 2022 Commonwealth Games